The nation of Yugoslavia was formed on December 1, 1918 as a  result of the realignment of nations and national boundaries in Europe in the aftermath of World War I. The nation was first named the Kingdom of Serbs, Croats and Slovenes and was renamed the Kingdom of Yugoslavia in 1929. The kingdom occupied the area in the Balkans comprising the present-day states of Bosnia and Herzegovina, Serbia, Montenegro, North Macedonia, and most of present-day Slovenia and Croatia. The United States recognized the newly formed nation and commissioned its first envoy to the kingdom on July 17, 1919. Previously the U.S. had had an envoy extraordinary and minister plenipotentiary who was commissioned to Romania, Bulgaria, and Serbia while resident in Bucharest, Romania.  Towards the end of the 1930s, the diplomatic relations between Belgrade and Washington were raised from ministerial to the ambassadorial level.

At the beginning of World War II, the government of Yugoslavia fled Belgrade and formed a government in exile in London and later in Cairo. During that time the U.S. ambassadors continued to represent the United States in London and Cairo. The embassy was transferred back to Belgrade in 1945.

Between 1943 and 1992 the nation was known by various names, including the Democratic Federative Yugoslavia (1943), the Federal People's Republic of Yugoslavia (1946), and the Socialist Federal Republic of Yugoslavia (1963).

After the breakup of the Socialist Federal Republic of Yugoslavia in 1992, the remnants of the nation, comprising the republics of Serbia and Montenegro, constituted a new state known as the Federal Republic of Yugoslavia. On May 21, 1992, the United States announced that it did not recognize the Federal Republic. The ambassador had left Belgrade one week earlier. A series of chargés d'affaires represented the U.S. government until 1999, when the embassy was closed.

In 2001 the United States recognized the Federal Republic of Yugoslavia and commissioned an ambassador to Belgrade.

In 2003 the parliament of the Federal Republic of Yugoslavia ratified the Constitutional Charter, establishing a new state union and changing the name of the country from Yugoslavia to Serbia and Montenegro. The U.S. ambassador continued in his post as the ambassador to Serbia and Montenegro.

For ambassadors to Serbia before and after Yugoslavia, see United States Ambassador to Serbia.

Ambassadors

Montgomery was the last ambassador sent by the U.S. to a state known as Yugoslavia. Hereafter ambassadors in Belgrade were commissioned to Serbia and Montenegro until 2006, and then to Serbia onward. For subsequent ambassadors in Belgrade, see United States Ambassador to Serbia.

See also
 Socialist Federal Republic of Yugoslavia
 Federal Republic of Yugoslavia
 United States Ambassador to Bosnia and Herzegovina
 United States Ambassador to Croatia
 United States Ambassador to Macedonia
 United States Ambassador to Montenegro
 United States Ambassador to Serbia
 United States Ambassador to Slovenia

Notes

References
United States Dep’t of State: Background notes on Serbia
United States Dep’t of State: Ambassadors to Yugoslavia
United States Dep’t of State: Ambassadors to Serbia and Montenegro

Yugoslavia
 
Amabassadors